Bexar can refer to:

Places:
Bexar County, Texas, containing the city of San Antonio
Bexar, Alabama, a community
Bexar, Arkansas, an unincorporated community
Béxar, a former spelling of Béjar, a city in the province of Salamanca in western Spain

Military uses:
USS Bexar (APA-237), a Haskell-class attack transport in the US Navy
Siege of Béxar (or Bejar), an early campaign of the Texas Revolution

See also
Behar (disambiguation)
Bejar (disambiguation)